The 2010 Arena Football League season was the inaugural season of the second incarnation of the Arena Football League, and the 23rd season of indoor football staged under the "Arena Football" brand.  The regular season began on April 2, 2010 and ended on July 31. The season ended with ArenaBowl XXIII on August 20.

Final standings

 Green indicates clinched playoff berth
 Purple indicates division champion
 Gray indicates conference champion

Schedule

Week 1

Week 2

Week 3

Week 4

Week 5

Week 6

Week 7

Week 8

Week 9

Week 10

Week 11

Week 12

Week 13

Week 14

Week 15

Week 16

Week 17

Week 18

Statistics
Final Statistics

Passing

Rushing

Receiving

Playoffs

Conference semifinals

Conference finals

ArenaBowl XXIII

All-Arena team

References